The 2019 New Mexico State Aggies football team represented New Mexico State University in the 2019 NCAA Division I FBS football season. The Aggies were led by seventh–year head coach Doug Martin and played their home games at Aggie Memorial Stadium. They competed as an independent.

Previous season
The Aggies finished the 2018 season 3–9 and did not qualify for a bowl game.

Schedule

Schedule Source:

Game summaries

at Washington State

at Alabama

San Diego State

at New Mexico

Fresno State

Liberty

at Central Michigan

at Georgia Southern

at Ole Miss

Incarnate Word

UTEP

at Liberty

Players drafted into the NFL

References

New Mexico State
New Mexico State Aggies football seasons
New Mexico State Aggies football